In particle physics, proton decay is a hypothetical form of particle decay in which the proton decays into lighter subatomic particles, such as a neutral pion and a positron. The proton decay hypothesis was first formulated by Andrei Sakharov in 1967.  Despite significant experimental effort, proton decay has never been observed. If it does decay via a positron, the proton's half-life is constrained to be at least  years.

According to the Standard Model, the proton, a type of baryon, is stable because baryon number (quark number) is conserved (under normal circumstances; see chiral anomaly for an exception). Therefore, protons will not decay into other particles on their own, because they are the lightest (and therefore least energetic) baryon. Positron emission and electron capture – forms of radioactive decay which see a proton become a neutron – are not proton decay, since the proton interacts with other particles within the atom.

Some beyond-the-Standard Model grand unified theories (GUTs) explicitly break the baryon number symmetry, allowing protons to decay via the Higgs particle, magnetic monopoles, or new X bosons with a half-life of 10 to 10 years. For comparison, the universe is roughly 1.38 × 10 years old. To date, all attempts to observe new phenomena predicted by GUTs (like proton decay or the existence of magnetic monopoles) have failed.

Quantum tunnelling may be one of the mechanisms of proton decay.

Quantum gravity (via virtual black holes and Hawking radiation) may also provide a venue of proton decay at magnitudes or lifetimes well beyond the GUT scale decay range above, as well as extra dimensions in supersymmetry.

There are theoretical methods of baryon violation other than proton decay including interactions with changes of baryon and/or lepton number other than 1 (as required in proton decay). These included B and/or L violations of 2, 3, or other numbers, or B − L violation. Such examples include neutron oscillations and the electroweak sphaleron anomaly at high energies and temperatures that can result between the collision of protons into antileptons or vice versa (a key factor in leptogenesis and non-GUT baryogenesis).

Baryogenesis 

One of the outstanding problems in modern physics is the predominance of matter over antimatter in the universe. The universe, as a whole, seems to have a nonzero positive baryon number density – that is, there is more matter than antimatter. Since it is assumed in cosmology that the particles we see were created using the same physics we measure today, it would normally be expected that the overall baryon number should be zero, as matter and antimatter should have been created in equal amounts. This has led to a number of proposed mechanisms for symmetry breaking that favour the creation of normal matter (as opposed to antimatter) under certain conditions. This imbalance would have been exceptionally small, on the order of 1 in every  (1010) particles a small fraction of a second after the Big Bang, but after most of the matter and antimatter annihilated, what was left over was all the baryonic matter in the current universe, along with a much greater number of bosons.

Most grand unified theories explicitly break the baryon number symmetry, which would account for this discrepancy, typically invoking reactions mediated by very massive X bosons  or massive Higgs bosons. The rate at which these events occur is governed largely by the mass of the intermediate  or  particles, so by assuming these reactions are responsible for the majority of the baryon number seen today, a maximum mass can be calculated above which the rate would be too slow to explain the presence of matter today. These estimates predict that a large volume of material will occasionally exhibit a spontaneous proton decay.

Experimental evidence 
Proton decay is one of the key predictions of the various grand unified theories (GUTs) proposed in the 1970s, another major one being the existence of magnetic monopoles. Both concepts have been the focus of major experimental physics efforts since the early 1980s. To date, all attempts to observe these events have failed; however, these experiments have been able to establish lower bounds on the half-life of the proton.  Currently, the most precise results come from the Super-Kamiokande water Cherenkov radiation detector in Japan: a 2015 analysis placed a lower bound on the proton's half-life of  years via positron decay, and similarly, a 2012 analysis gave a lower bound to the proton's half-life of  years via antimuon decay, close to a supersymmetry (SUSY) prediction of 1034–1036 years. An upgraded version, Hyper-Kamiokande, probably will have sensitivity 5–10 times better than Super-Kamiokande.

Theoretical motivation 
Despite the lack of observational evidence for proton decay, some grand unification theories, such as the SU(5) Georgi–Glashow model and SO(10), along with their supersymmetric variants, require it. According to such theories, the proton has a half-life of about ~ years and decays into a positron and a neutral pion that itself immediately decays into two gamma ray photons:

Since a positron is an antilepton this decay preserves  number, which is conserved in most GUTs.

Additional decay modes are available, both directly and when catalyzed via interaction with GUT-predicted magnetic monopoles. Though this process has not been observed experimentally, it is within the realm of experimental testability for future planned very large-scale detectors on the megaton scale. Such detectors include the Hyper-Kamiokande.

Early grand unification theories (GUTs) such as the Georgi–Glashow model, which were the first consistent theories to suggest proton decay, postulated that the proton's half-life would be at least  years. As further experiments and calculations were performed in the 1990s, it became clear that the proton half-life could not lie below  years. Many books from that period refer to this figure for the possible decay time for baryonic matter. More recent findings have pushed the minimum proton half-life to at least ~ years, ruling out the simpler GUTs (including minimal SU(5) / Georgi–Glashow) and most non-SUSY models. The maximum upper limit on proton lifetime (if unstable), is calculated at  a bound applicable to SUSY models, with a maximum for (minimal) non-SUSY GUTs at 

Although the phenomenon is referred to as "proton decay", the effect would also be seen in neutrons bound inside atomic nuclei. Free neutrons – those not inside an atomic nucleus – are already known to decay into protons (and an electron and an antineutrino) in a process called beta decay. Free neutrons have a half-life of 10 minutes
due to the weak interaction. Neutrons bound inside a nucleus have an immensely longer half-life – apparently as great as that of the proton.

Projected proton lifetimes

Supersymmetric GUTs with reunification scales around   yield a lifetime of around 1034 yr, roughly the current experimental lower bound.

Decay operators

Dimension-6 proton decay operators 
All of these operators violate both baryon number (B) and lepton number (L) conservation but not the combination B − L.

See doublet–triplet splitting problem.

Dimension-5 proton decay operators 
In supersymmetric extensions (such as the MSSM), we can also have dimension-5 operators involving two fermions and two sfermions caused by the exchange of a tripletino of mass M. The sfermions will then exchange a gaugino or Higgsino or gravitino leaving two fermions. The overall Feynman diagram has a loop (and other complications due to strong interaction physics). This decay rate is suppressed by  where MSUSY is the mass scale of the superpartners.

Dimension-4 proton decay operators 

In the absence of matter parity, supersymmetric extensions of the Standard Model can give rise to the last operator suppressed by the inverse square of sdown quark mass. This is due to the dimension-4 operators
c and
ccc.

See also 
 Age of the universe
 B − L
 Virtual black hole
 Weak hypercharge
 X and Y bosons

References

Further reading

External links

 Proton decay at Super-Kamiokande
 Pictorial history of the IMB experiment
 

Proton
Nuclear physics
Physics beyond the Standard Model
Grand Unified Theory
Supersymmetric quantum field theory
Hypothetical processes
Ultimate fate of the universe
1967 in science

ja:陽子#陽子の崩壊